Split/Second (released in Europe as Split/Second: Velocity) is an arcade racing video game developed by Black Rock Studio and published by Disney Interactive Studios for Microsoft Windows, PlayStation 3, and Xbox 360. Announced on 11 March 2009, the game was released on 18 May 2010 and was later released for OnLive in June 2011. In the game, players take part in a fictional reality television show, consisting of a variety of events, each focusing on destructible environments triggered remotely by driver actions known as "power plays".

Split/Second was ported to the PlayStation Portable in November 2010 by Sumo Digital.

Gameplay
In Split/Second, players take part in a fictional reality TV program where participants race for money and fame. Throughout a race, players can build up their "power play" meter by performing stunts, such as jumps and mid-air overtakes, and precision driving, such as drafting opponents and drifting. As players build up their meter, special events can be triggered, which create obstacles for other players, open up temporary shortcuts, or alter an entire section of the race course. These triggers are also activated by the AI opponents.

Such events range from shockwave-inducing explosions to buckling highways and dam breaches. The severity of the events available to trigger varies depending on how full the player's meter is. The Level 1 events become available when one or two of the three segments of the bar are full, while the Level 2 events can only be triggered upon a full bar. Event locations, and the vehicles they will affect, are highlighted with blue icons for the level one power plays, and red icons for level two, and the player must time the action accurately in order to hinder the opposition as much as possible. The power play meter is used up by one segment once a level one event is triggered, so the player must also choose whether to activate the less destructive first-level events as soon as they are available, or save the power play energy and build it up further in order to trigger the top-tier actions.

There are also certain power plays that can be reused, such as explosives dropped from helicopters, exploding tankers, and shortcuts, but some other power plays are permanent and can only be used once in a single race. Black Rock Studio also wanted to make the HUD as simple as possible by taking away all unnecessary elements such as the speedometer and the track map (rendered useless due to the dynamic nature of the track) leaving only the lap count (also the target time in "Detonator" and "Air Revenge" mode as well as target score in "Air Strike" and "Survival" mode), the position that the player is in, and the power play meter, all positioned behind the player's car to avoid detracting from the scenery.<ref>{{cite web|url=http://www.mtv.com/news/2459097/splitseconds-simple-hud/|title='Split/Seconds Simple HUD|publisher=MTV|author=john Tracey|date=2009-03-24}}</ref>

The game also has a multiplayer mode, with both 8-player online and 2-player split-screen offline available. There are 15 tracks in the standard game, most of which are located in a lifesize set of a city (shown under construction in the tutorial). Two tracks could be acquired as downloadable content.

Downloadable content
A "time savers" DLC pack was released upon the game's launch, which unlocks all cars, tracks and modes without the player having to unlock them by playing through the game's "Season" mode.

The "High Octane Supercar" pack was released on 31 August 2010 as paid DLC, featuring the Cobretti Severus, the Ryback Vulcan, and the Hanzo Katana. In addition, the Elite Vehicle Livery and Ryback Cyclone Special (a stronger, upgraded version of a standard car) packs were released for free.

The next paid download was released as the "Survival at the Rock" pack and included a new Survival mode track (Minepit Park) and a new multiplayer-only mode (Survival Race; a racing variant of the Survival mode). It was released on 12 October.

Another vehicle pack, entitled the "Deadline" pack, was released on 20 October. The Deadline pack includes three new cars (the Hanzo Kanobo, Cobretti Centaur, and Ryback Javelin) and a new livery for the Ryback Coyote vehicle. Also included is the Deadline mode, a variation of Detonator (a time trial with automatically triggered power plays) where pickups spread across the track can pause the timer.

The final known pack is the "Quarry Onslaught" pack, released to Xbox Live Marketplace on 2 November 2010. Included with this pack are the "Quarry" race course and the "Onslaught" game type. During an Onslaught event, racers are challenged to pull ahead of the competition while the helicopter fires missiles onto the track. Points are awarded based on how close to the front racers are, and the game will end after twenty missile waves.

All the downloadable content, with the exception of the two free addons, is available in Europe as part of the "Ultimate Edition", a complete bundle that also includes the digital version of the game.

Steam version
As part of Disney Interactive's new offering on Steam in late 2014, Split/Second was included alongside other titles such as Epic Mickey 2. This version of the game does not have support for online multiplayer matchmaking, but virtual private network services can be used to facilitate online connections through the game's LAN features. There are also game cards and badges from Split/Second that can be earned.

PSP version
The PlayStation Portable (PSP) version was released on 17 November 2010, with porting and development duties handled by Sumo Digital. The PSP version of the game features, among other changes, an extra track based on the "Docks" environment. The track (simply called "The Docks") is a composite course that takes the drivers through areas from each of the three other Docks environment courses (Dry Docks, Ferry Wharf, and Port Bridge) in a single lap. The PSP version also adds new gameplay modes that offer variants on the core game (such as drifting around the training course to earn points). It also offers some changes to the game itself, such as revamped physics to make driving easier on the PSP. Subtle changes to track design, event rules, and car statistics were also made.

The PSP version supports ad hoc multiplayer for up to four drivers.

Reception
 Critical reception Split/Second'' received positive reviews at aggregate site Metacritic.

Sales 
Despite positive reviews from critics, the game was a commercial failure. It sold only 86,000 copies in the United States in its first 12 days.

Cancelled sequel
After finishing Episode 12, a cutscene is shown in which power plays in the city are activated by unknown perpetrators in construction vehicles (with the panicked voice of a TV crew member claiming that the group "were taken off air in '82") followed by a black screen reading "To be continued...".

However, in May 2011, Eurogamer spoke to an anonymous source that confirmed Disney Interactive Studios had made a reduction at Black Rock Studio's workforce. Due to Disney's new management, the game was cancelled in December 2010 despite attempts to fit with their new business model.

Notes

References

External links
Official UK website

2010 video games
IOS games
PlayStation 3 games
PlayStation Portable games
Racing video games
Video games developed in the United Kingdom
Windows games
Xbox 360 games
Disney video games
Multiplayer and single-player video games
Split-screen multiplayer games
Java platform games
Video games using Havok
Sumo Digital games